Chembukkadavu Weir is a small diversion dam constructed across Chalipuzha in Kodenchery village of Kozhikode district in Kerala, India. The location of the scheme is at Chembukadavu near Tusharagiri in Kodencherry village of Kozhikode district. It is 55 km away from Kozhikode town. The weir is constructed across Chalipuzha river. After power generation, water from the power station is utilised for Chembukadavu II. The Power generated in the station is at 6.3 kV. This is stepped up to 33 kV and transmitted to 110 kV substation, Agasthyamoozhy. The weir and the power house is operated and maintained by Kerala State Electricity Board.

Specifications 

 LocationLatitude:11⁰28’13.5”N
 Longitude:76⁰2’46.9”E
 Panchayath : Kodenchery
 Village : Kodenchery
 District : Kozhikode
 River Basin : Chaliyar
 River : Chalipuzha
 Release from Dam to river : Chalipuzha
 Taluk through which release flows : Thamarassery
 Year of completion : 2003
 Name of Project : Kuttiady Augmentation Scheme
 Purpose of Project : Hydro Power

Kakkayam, PIN-673615 Phone.9446008466

 Installed capacity of the Project : 3×0.9(2.7MW)

Dam Features

 Type of Dam : RCC lining over a RR core structure
 Classification : Trench type diversion weir. 
 Maximum Water Level (MWL) : EL 302.9 m
 Full Reservoir Level ( FRL) : EL 302.9 m
 Storage at FRL : Diversion only
 Height from deepest foundation : 6.5 m
 Length : 35.50 m
 Spillway : No spillway
 Crest Level : EL 302.9 m
 River Outlet : Nil
 Officers in charge & phone No. : Executive Engineer, KG Division,

See also
Chembukkadavu 2 Weir

References 

Dams in Kerala
Dams completed in 2003